Nityakarma refers to obligatory Vedic duties that are prescribed for daily practice in Hinduism. Nityakarma is among the three ritual actions classified by the Mimamsa philosophy, along with nisiddhakarma and kamyakarma. It is also featured in the Shaiva Siddhanta philosophy.

Description 
According to Parasara, the six activities are regarded to be nityakarmas:

Snana (bathing)
Sandhyavandanam (morning and evening prayers)
Recitation of the Vedas
Veneration of ancestors
Homam (offerings to fire)
Tarpana (worship of the gods)

See also
Kamyakarma
Shrauta

References 

Rituals in Hindu worship
Hindu philosophical concepts